Nathalie is a 1957 French-Italian comedy crime film directed by Christian-Jaque and starring Martine Carol, Mischa Auer and Michel Piccoli. It was shot at the Joinville Studios of Franstudio and the Photosonor Studios, both in Paris. Location shooting also took place around the city including the Printemps department store and Paris Airport. The film's sets were designed by the art director Robert Gys. It was followed by a sequel Nathalie, Secret Agent in 1959, also starring Carol.

Synopsis
Nathalie, a model at a Parisian fashion house is wrongly accused of a stealing a valuable clip from a customer, the countess de Lancy. When it is discovered soon afterwards she takes it to the Neuilly residence of the countess, but finds her dead. She is then kidnapped by some gangsters but manages to escape, and makes contact with a police officer she is friendly with. Together they embark on an investigation. She discovers that the countess was the leader of a gang of thieves, who has been murdered by an underworld rival.

Cast
 Martine Carol as 	Nathalie Princesse
 Mischa Auer as 	Cyril Boran 
 Michel Piccoli as 	L'inspecteur Franck Marchal
 Louis Seigner a s	Le commissaire Pipart 
 Lise Delamare as 	La comtesse de Lancy 
 Jacques Dufilho as 	Simon, le domestique de comtesse / Simon the Valet
 Pierre Goutas as 	Un ami de Coco
 Grégoire Gromoff as 	Le chauffeur de taxi
 Jacques Mancier as 	Un inspecteur
 Jacques Mauclair as 	Émile Truffaut
 Armande Navarre as 	Pivoine
 Hubert Noël as Serge Lambert
 Frédéric O'Brady as Patins à ressort', lhomme au pied-bot / The Traveler 
 Fernand Rauzéna as 	Géo, un ami de Coco
 Jess Hahn as 	Sam
 Aimé Clariond as Le comte Auguste Claude Superbe de Lancy 
 Philippe Clay as 	Adolphe Faisant, dit "Coco la Girafe"

References

Bibliography 
 Chiti, Roberto & Poppi, Roberto. Dizionario del cinema italiano: Dal 1945 al 1959. Gremese Editore, 1991.
 Goble, Alan. The Complete Index to Literary Sources in Film. Walter de Gruyter, 1999.
 Nowell-Smith, Geoffrey. The Oxford History of World Cinema. Oxford University Press, 1996.

External links 
 

1957 films
French comedy films
Italian comedy films
1957 comedy films
1950s French-language films
Films directed by Christian-Jaque
Gaumont Film Company films
Films based on French novels
Films shot at Joinville Studios
Films set in Paris
Films shot in Paris
1950s French films
1950s Italian films